Ivan Karazelidi is a Kazakhstani judoka who was the 1993 Asian Champion in the men's half-lightweight (–65 kg) category.

References

Asian Games silver medalists for Kazakhstan
Judoka at the 1994 Asian Games
Kazakhstani male judoka
Living people
Medalists at the 1994 Asian Games
Sportspeople from Karaganda
Year of birth missing (living people)
Asian Games medalists in judo
20th-century Kazakhstani people